Two submarines of the United States Navy have been named USS Sealion for the sea lion, any of several large, eared seals native to the Pacific. 

United States Navy ship names